Buq Aqable District is a district in the central Hiran region of Somalia.

References

Districts of Somalia